Talavera Fútbol Sala was a futsal club based in Talavera de la Reina, city of the province of Toledo in the autonomous community of Castile-La Mancha.

The club was founded in 1990 and her stadium is Pabellón 1º de Mayo with 3,000 seaters.

The club was sponsored by Azulejos Ramos until 2008–09 season. From 2010–11 to 2011–12, the club was sponsored by Organización Impulsora de Discapacitados (OID).

History
Talavera Fútbol Sala was founded in 1990. During a long time, Talavera FS was the reserve side of CLM Talavera. On May 15, 2010, GE Talavera achieved the promotion to División de Honor for first time in its history, by winning the promotion playoff to Fisiomedia Manacor.

Before 2012–13 season, Talavera was not admitted by LNFS due to failing to meet the financial criteria to play in Primera División. They were accepted to play in Segunda División B.

In July 2013, after 23 years of sporting activity, the club was disbanded due to unpaid debts (€300,000) and lack of support from public and private organizations.

Season to season

1 seasons in Primera División
7 seasons in Segunda División
7 seasons in Segunda División B
4 seasons in Tercera División

Current squad

pavilion information
Name: - 1º de Mayo
City: - Talavera de la Reina
Capacity: - 3,000
Address: - C/ Nicaragua, s/n
Inaugurated: - May 1, 1987

References

External links
Official website
Unofficial blog
LNFS profile

1990 establishments in Castilla–La Mancha
2013 disestablishments in Castilla–La Mancha
Futsal clubs in Spain
Futsal clubs established in 1990
Sports clubs disestablished in 2013
Sports teams in Castilla–La Mancha
Sport in Talavera de la Reina